Kicking Harold is an alternative hard rock band from Los Angeles, California that has been active since the mid-1990s. With the success of popular songs like "Kill You" and "Down on You" they secured a major label release of their indie album, Ugly & Festering, on MCA Records in 1995. The albums Return of the Bulb Men (1997) and Space Age Breakdown (2002) followed on independent record labels, with Kicking Harold's song "Gasoline" from Space Age Breakdown being featured as the theme to TLC's hit automobile makeover show, Overhaulin', for 72 episodes.

In 2009, Kicking Harold's singer/guitarist Tim David Kelly brought the band out of mothballs due to the continuing success of "Gasoline" and released their fourth album, "Zombies, Cars & Evil Guitars" in 2010. The 5th full-length album, Red Light District followed in Jan 2015. The album features an updated version of their hit "Kill You", originally released on their out-of-print album Ugly & Festering, as its debut single accompanied by a music video, filled with "vine style" digital sleight of hand effects and a cameo surprise ending by actress, Mary Carey. The band finished the promotion of Red Light District with a 25-date US Tour with The Winery Dogs during the autumn of 2015. They released their 6th album, Darker Angels, in 2022, with a promotion on their website to buy the album signed by Tim David Kelly with 4 stickers.

Discography
The Cassette EP (1994)
Ugly & Festering* (1995)
Return of the Bulb Men (1997)
Space Age Breakdown (2002)
Zombies, Cars & Evil Guitars (2010)
Red Light District (2015)
Everything & Working Man (2016)
Cassette Demos and Other Lo-Fi Oddities (2021)
Darker Angels (2022)
*The album has gone out of print, however the album was available as a free download. The link now leads to an error page.

References

External links
Official Kicking Harold website

Alternative rock groups from California